Pieris formosa, called the Taiwan pieris or the Himalayan andromeda, is a species of flowering plant in the genus Pieris native to Nepal, the eastern Himalaya, Assam in India, Myanmar, Vietnam, Tibet, central and southern China, but not Taiwan. The 'Wakehurst' cultivar of the variety Pieris formosa var. forrestii has gained the Royal Horticultural Society's Award of Garden Merit as an ornamental, and is also considered by them as a good plant to attract pollinators. The trusses of creamy white flowers open at the same time as the young leaves. Like all pieris, it prefers a partially shaded spot in acid pH soil.

References

formosa
Plants described in 1834